The Piper PA-28 Cherokee is a family of two-seat or four-seat light aircraft built by Piper Aircraft and designed for flight training, air taxi and personal use. The PA-28 family of aircraft comprises all-metal, unpressurized, single-engined, piston-powered airplanes with low-mounted wings and tricycle landing gear. They have a single door on the right side, which is entered by stepping on the wing.

The first PA-28 received its type certificate from the Federal Aviation Administration in 1960 and the series remains in production to this day. Current models are the Warrior, Arrow, and Archer TX and LX, and the Pilot 100 and 100i. The Archer was discontinued in 2009, but with investment from new company ownership, the model was put back into production in 2010.

The PA-28 series competes with the high-winged Cessna 172 and the similarly low-winged Grumman American AA-5 series and Beechcraft Musketeer designs.

Piper has created variations within the Cherokee family by installing engines ranging from 140 to 300 hp (105–220 kW), offering turbocharging, retractable landing gear, constant-speed propellers and stretching the fuselage to accommodate six people. The Piper PA-32 (initially known as "Cherokee Six") is a larger, six-seat variant of the PA-28. The PA-32R Saratoga variant was in production until 2009.

Development

At the time of the Cherokee's introduction, Piper's primary single-engined, all-metal aircraft was the Piper PA-24 Comanche, a larger, faster aircraft with retractable landing gear and a constant-speed propeller. Karl Bergey, Fred Weick and John Thorp designed the Cherokee as a less expensive alternative to the Comanche, with lower manufacturing and parts costs to compete with the Cessna 172, although some later Cherokees also featured retractable gear and constant-speed propellers.

The Cherokee and Comanche lines continued in parallel production, serving different market segments for over a decade, until Comanche production was ended in 1972, to be replaced by the Piper PA-32R family.

The original design

The original Cherokees were the Cherokee 150 and Cherokee 160 (PA-28-150 and PA-28-160), which started production in 1961 (unless otherwise mentioned, the model number always refers to horsepower).

In 1962, Piper added the Cherokee 180 (PA-28-180) powered by a 180-horsepower (134-kW) Lycoming O-360 engine. The extra power made it practical to fly with all four seats filled (depending on passenger weight and fuel loading) and the model remains popular on the used-airplane market. In 1968, the cockpit was modified to replace the "push-pull"-style engine throttle controls with quadrant levers. In addition, a third window was added to each side, giving the fuselage the more modern look seen in most recent production.

Piper continued to expand the line rapidly. In 1963, the company introduced the even more powerful Cherokee 235 (PA-28-235), which competed favorably with the Cessna 182 Skylane for load-carrying capability. It included tip tanks of 17-gallon capacity each, bringing the total fuel capacity of the Cherokee 235 to 84 gallons. The aircraft had its fuselage stretched in 1973, giving much more leg room in the rear. The stabilator area was increased, as well. In 1973, the marketing name was changed from "235" to "Charger". In 1974, it was changed again to "Pathfinder". Production of the Pathfinder continued until 1977. No 1978 models were built. In 1979, the aircraft was given the Piper tapered wing and the name was changed again, this time to Dakota.

In 1964, the company filled in the bottom end of the line with the Cherokee 140 (PA-28-140), which was designed for training and initially shipped with only two seats. The PA-28-140 engine was slightly modified shortly after its introduction to produce 150 horsepower (112 kW), but kept the -140 name.

In 1967, Piper introduced the PA-28R-180 Cherokee Arrow. This aircraft featured a constant-speed propeller and retractable landing gear and was powered by a 180-horsepower (134-kW) Lycoming IO-360-B1E engine. A 200-hp (149-kW) version powered by a Lycoming IO-360-C1C was offered as an option beginning in 1969 and designated the PA-28R-200; the 180-hp model was dropped after 1971. At the time the Arrow was introduced, Piper removed the Cherokee 150 and Cherokee 160 from production.

The Arrow II came out in 1972, featuring a five-inch fuselage stretch to increase legroom for the rear-seat passengers. In 1977, Piper introduced the Arrow III (PA-28R-201), which featured a semi-tapered wing and longer stabilator, a design feature that had previously been introduced successfully on the PA-28-181 and provided better low-speed handling. It also featured larger fuel tanks, increasing capacity from 50 to 77 gallons.

The first turbocharged model, the PA-28R-201T, was also offered in 1977, powered by a six-cylinder Continental TSIO-360-F engine equipped with a Rajay turbocharger. A three-bladed propeller was optional.

In 1979, the Arrow was restyled again as the PA-28RT-201 Arrow IV, featuring a "T" tail that resembled the other aircraft in the Piper line at the time.

In 1971, Piper released a Cherokee 140 variant called the Cherokee Cruiser 2+2 (also known as the Cherokee Flightliner). Although the plane kept the 140 designation, it was, in fact, a 150-hp plane and was shipped mainly as a four-seat version. In 1973, the Cherokee 180 was named the Cherokee Challenger and had its fuselage lengthened slightly and its wings widened and the Cherokee 235 was named the Charger with similar airframe modifications. In 1974, Piper changed the marketing names of some of the Cherokee models again, renaming the Cruiser 2+2 (140) simply the Cruiser, the Challenger to the Archer (model PA-28-181), and the Charger (235) to Pathfinder.

Piper reintroduced the Cherokee 150 in 1974, renaming it the Cherokee Warrior (PA-28-151) and giving it the Archer's stretched body and a new, semi-tapered wing.

In 1977, Piper stopped producing the Cruiser (140) and Pathfinder (235), but introduced a new 235-hp (175-kW) plane, the Dakota (PA-28-236), based on the Cherokee 235, Charger, and Pathfinder models, but with the new semi-tapered wing.

The PA-28-201T Turbo Dakota followed the introduction of the PA-28-236 Dakota in 1979. The airframe was essentially the same as a fixed-gear Arrow III and was powered by a turbocharged Continental TSIO-360-FB engine producing 200 hp (149 kW). The aircraft did not sell well and production ended in 1980.

In 1977, Piper upgraded the Warrior to 160 hp (119 kW) PA-28-161, changing its name to Cherokee Warrior II. This aircraft had slightly improved aerodynamic wheel fairings introduced in 1978. Later models of the Warrior II, manufactured after July 1982, incorporated a gross weight increase to 2,440 pounds, giving a useful load over 900 pounds. This same aircraft, now available with a glass cockpit, was available as the Warrior III and was marketed as a training aircraft.

PA-32

In 1965, Piper developed the Piper Cherokee Six, designated the PA-32, by stretching the PA-28 design. It featured a lengthened fuselage and seating for one pilot and five passengers.

Brazilian, Argentinian and Chilean production

PA-28s were built under license in Brazil as the Embraer EMB-711A and EMB-711C Corisco (PA-28R-200), EMB-711B (PA-28R-201), EMB-711T (PA-28RT-201) and EMB-711ST Corisco Turbo (PA-28RT-201T) and the EMB-712 Tupi (PA-28-181). Argentinian production was carried out by Chincul SACAIFI of San Juan, Argentina. Chincul S. A. built 960 airplanes between 1972 and 1995, including the Cherokee Archer, Dakota, Arrow and Turbo Arrow. The PA-28-236 Dakota was also assembled under license by the Maintenance Wing of the Chilean Air Force (which later became known as ENAER). By September 1982, 20 Dakotas had been assembled in Chile.

New Piper Aircraft

The original Piper Aircraft company declared bankruptcy in 1991. In 1995, the New Piper Aircraft company was created. It was renamed Piper Aircraft once again in 2006. The company originally produced one variant, the 180-horsepower (134 kW) Archer LX (PA-28-181), and began testing two diesel versions, with 135 and 155 hp.

As of 2022, five variants of the PA-28 are in production:

 Archer TX and LX with a  Lycoming IO-360-A4M engine, a  TAS maximum cruise speed,  range and a Garmin G1000 avionics suite
 Archer DX and DLX with a  Continental CD-155 engine, a  TAS maximum cruise speed,  range and a Garmin G1000 avionics suite
 Pilot 100i with a  Lycoming IO-360-B4A engine, a  TAS maximum cruise speed,  range and Garmin G3X avionics.

Design

Wing
Originally, all Cherokees had a constant-chord, rectangular planform wing, popularly called the "Hershey Bar" wing because of its resemblance to the convex, rectangular chocolate bar.

Beginning with the Warrior in 1974, Piper switched to a semi-tapered wing with the NACA 652-415 profile and a  wingspan. The constant chord is maintained from the root to mid-wing, at which point a tapered section sweeping backwards on the leading edge continues until the tip. Both Cherokee wing variants have an angled wing root; i.e., the wing chord is greater at the root, with the leading edge swept back as it leaves the fuselage body, rather than the wing meeting the body at a perpendicular angle.

Debate is ongoing about the relative benefits of the two wing shapes. According to the Cherokee's lead designer, Fred Weick, the semi-tapered wing was introduced to "improve stall characteristics and increase wingspan," and side-by-side testing of the two shapes found that with the semitapered wing, "the plane had better climb and flatter flight characteristics"  The original 1974 version of the wing had a structural weakness that caused a structural failure during an aerobatic maneuver, but that was fixed for all later wings. According to Terry Lee Rogers (summarizing interviews with Weick), "the outboard wing sections had a different taper than the wing root, which permitted them to retain control even when the inboard sections were stalled."

However, designer John Thorp, who collaborated with Weick in the late 1950s on an early 180 hp version of the PA-28 (with Hershey-bar wings) and was not involved in the later semi-tapered design, publicly disagreed: "Tapered wings tend to stall outboard, reducing aileron effectiveness and increasing the likelihood of a rolloff into a spin."

Aviation journalist Peter Garrison is also in the Hershey-bar wing camp, claiming that the semitapered shape has a neutral effect on drag: "to prevent tip stall, designers have resorted to providing the outboard portions of tapered wings with more cambered airfoil sections, drooped or enlarged leading edges, fixed or automatic leading edge slots or slats and most commonly, wing twist or "washout". The trouble with these fixes is that they all increase the drag, cancelling whatever benefit the tapered wing was supposed to deliver in the first place."

Flight controls
For the Cherokee family, Piper used their traditional flight-control configuration. The horizontal tail is a stabilator with an antiservo tab (sometimes termed an antibalance tab). The antiservo tab moves in the same direction of the stabilator movement, making pitch control "heavier" as the stabilator moves out of the trimmed position. Flaps can extend up to 40° and 25° flaps are normally used for a short- or soft-field takeoff. The ailerons, flaps, stabilator and stabilator trim are all controlled using cables and pulleys.

In the cockpit, all Cherokees use control yokes rather than sticks, together with rudder pedals. The pilot operates the flaps manually using a Johnson bar located between the front seats: for zero degrees, the lever is flat against the floor and is pulled up to select the detent positions of 10, 25, and 40°.

Older Cherokees use an overhead crank for stabilator trim (correctly called an antiservo tab), while later ones use a trim wheel on the floor between the front seats, immediately behind the flap bar.

All Cherokees have a brake lever under the pilot side of the instrument panel. Differential toe brakes on the rudder pedals were an optional add-on for earlier Cherokees and became standard with later models.

Some earlier Cherokees used control knobs for the throttle, mixture, and propeller advance (where applicable), while later Cherokees use a collection of two or three control levers in a throttle quadrant.

Cherokees normally include a rudder trim knob, which actually controls a set of springs acting on the rudder pedals rather than an external trim tab on the rudder—in other words, the surface is trimmed by control tension rather than aerodynamically.

Variants
PA-28-140 Cherokee Cruiser
First certified on 14 February 1964. Approved as a  gross weight four place aircraft on 17 June 1965.
PA-28-150 Cherokee
First certified on 2 June 1961.

First certified on 9 August 1973. Changes from the PA-28-150 include a tapered wing.
PA-28-160 Cherokee
First certified on 31 October 1960.

First certified on 2 November 1976. Changes from the PA-28-160 include a tapered wing.
PA-28-161 Warrior III
First certified on 1 July 1994.
PA-28-180 Cherokee
First certified on 3 August 1962.

First certified on 22 May 1972. Changes from the PA-28-180 Cherokee include a five inch fuselage extension, wing span increase, larger horizontal tail, gross weight increase and other minor changes.
PA-28-181 Archer II
First certified on 8 July 1975. Changes from the PA-28-180 include a tapered wing.
PA-28-181 Archer III
First certified on 30 August 1994.
PA-28-201T Turbo Dakota
First certified on 14 December 1978.
PA-28-235 Cherokee Pathfinder
First certified on 15 July 1963.
PA-28-235 Cherokee Pathfinder
First certified on 9 June 1972. Changes from the 1963 certified PA-28-235 Cherokee Pathfinder include a five inch fuselage extension, wing span increase, larger horizontal tail, gross weight increase and other minor changes.
PA-28-236 Dakota
First certified on 1 June 1978. Changes from the 1972 certified PA-28-235 Cherokee Pathfinder include tapered wing.
PA-28S-160 Cherokee
First certified on 25 February 1963.
PA-28S-180 Cherokee
First certified on 10 May 1963.
PA-28R-180 Arrow
First certified on 8 June 1967.

First certified on 16 January 1969.
PA-28R-200 Arrow II
First certified on 2 December 1971. Changes from the 1969 certified PA-28R-200 Arrow include a five inch fuselage extension, wing span increase, larger horizontal tail, gross weight increase and other minor changes.
PA-28R-201 Arrow III
First certified on 2 November 1976.
PA-28R-201T Turbo Arrow III
First certified on 2 November 1976.
PA-28RT-201 Arrow IV
First certified on 13 November 1978. Features a T tail.
PA-28RT-201T Turbo Arrow IV
First certified on 13 November 1978. Features a T tail.
PA-28-161 Cadet
Replaced the PA-38 Tomahawk trainer in the late 1980s. Features the older Cherokee "2 side window" fuselage with the later tapered wing.
Archer DX
Introduced at AERO Friedrichshafen in April 2014. The compression-ignition engine is simpler to operate, avoiding starting difficulties, carburetor icing or propeller and mixture controls, and the liquid cooling does not suffer shock cooling in a rapid descent. The engine must be replaced every 2,100 hours.
Pilot 100 and Pilot 100i
New versions introduced in 2019 intended as low cost VFR and IFR trainers respectively, for the flight training market. Fixed landing gear, 180 hp Continental Prime IO-370-D3A, Garmin G3X Touch Certified avionics. IFR version includes GFC500 autopilot. Features the 2-side-window fuselage with the later tapered wing, no baggage door, no air conditioning, no instruments on right-hand panel, all-white paint with decals, two-place seating standard on 100, rear third seat with push-to-talk and Bluetooth functions standard on i100 and optional on 100. These new versions were type certified in the US in December 2020 and in Europe in August 2021.

Operators
The Cherokee series has been popular with private owners and flying clubs, with over 32,000 delivered.

Military operators

FAPA/DAA

Argentine Coast Guard

Chilean Air Force

Honduran Air Force

Indonesian Navy

Qatar Emiri Air Force

Retired

Colombian Navy – Retired.

Finnish Air Force – 14 x Cherokee Arrow 200 Retired 2005

Notable accidents and incidents

September 9, 1969, Allegheny Airlines Flight 853, a Douglas DC-9-31, collided with a Piper PA-28R-180 Cruiser over Fairland, Indiana, killing all aboard both planes.
August 28, 1972, Prince William of Gloucester was killed along with the copilot of his Piper Cherokee Arrow after crashing shortly after takeoff from Halfpenny Green in Staffordshire, England, in an air race.
August 31, 1986, Aeroméxico Flight 498, a Douglas DC-9-32, collided with a Piper PA-28-181 Archer, owned by William Kramer, over Cerritos, California, killing all 67 people aboard both planes and 15 people on the ground. It was the worst air disaster in the history of Los Angeles, and resulted in regulatory changes requiring all airliners to be equipped with a traffic collision avoidance system (TCAS) and all light aircraft operating in terminal control areas to be equipped with a mode C transponder.
On November 21, 1993, skydiver Alan Peters collided with the vertical stabilizer of a PA-28 while in freefall, after jumping from another aircraft. All four people aboard the PA-28 were killed after the plane lost control and crashed into a nearby forest. Peters was able to successfully open his parachute after the collision and survived, sustaining a fractured leg.
February 18, 2010, Andrew Joseph Stack III deliberately flew his Piper PA-28-236 Dakota into Building 1 of the Echelon office complex in Austin, Texas, in an apparent revenge attack on the Internal Revenue Service office located there.

November 17, 2011, a PA-28-180 crash four miles south of Perryville, Arkansas, claimed the life of Oklahoma State University head women's basketball coach Kurt Budke and assistant coach Miranda Serna, along with the pilot and another passenger.
On April 4, 2018, an Embry-Riddle student and his FAA examiner were killed when the left wing of their PA-28 (N106ER) came off as they flew west of Daytona Beach International Airport. An ERAU spokesman subsequently said that the University had stopped flying the PA-28.
On 27 May 2019, Brazilian singer Gabriel Diniz was killed in the crash of a Piper PA-28-180 Cherokee Archer in Estância, Brazil.
On 25 August 2019, award-winning music composer Jonathan Goldstein, his musician wife Hannah and their baby daughter were killed in the crash of a Piper PA-28 Arrow.  They were flying from Switzerland to Italy when their aircraft crashed above the pass near the Italian border.

Specifications (1964 model PA-28-140 Cherokee 140)

Notable appearances in media

See also

References

Sources

Bibliography

External links

Piper Cherokee and Arrow Safety Highlights  – Aircraft Owners and Pilots Association
Warrior used aircraft review by Tim Cole, AVweb

1960s United States civil utility aircraft
2010s missing person cases
Aircraft first flown in 1960
Low-wing aircraft
Missing person cases in Canada
Cherokee
Single-engined tractor aircraft